"Uvek kad popijem" (Whenever I Drink) is a song recorded by Serbian recording artist DJ Shone featuring pop star Dara Bubamara and rapper MC Yankoo. It was released 1 June 2014 through the label Shone Entertainment. The song was written by Ivana Malešević. It was produced and recorded in Belgrade.

The music video was shot in May 2014 and premiered 2 June 2014.

References

External links
Uvek kad popijem at Discogs

2014 singles
2014 songs